Waterloo is a village in Fauquier County, Virginia, in the United States, straddling the Rappahannock River at its confluence with Carter's Run.

History
With Fauquier County on the north side and Culpeper County on the south side, Waterloo is surrounded by relatively flat tracts of arable land.

Commercial activities in Waterloo began to thrive as the canal was constructed, because the water also could power mills. Eventually there was a sawmill, a clothing mill, a blacksmith, and a plan for a group of shops and factories on the Fauquier side to serve the community and the canal. However, when the Orange and Alexandria Railroad commenced operation in 1852, canal traffic rapidly declined, and venture ceased to operate in 1853.

During the Civil War, both Northern and South soldiers at various times occupied Waterloo. On August 22, 1862, General J. E. B. Stuart's army started its ride around the army of USA General John Pope Pope in Waterloo. Stuart's force captured Pope's headquarters wagons and destroyed Union supplies and army material, shortly before the second battle of Manassas. By war's end, all but a couple of Waterloo's buildings were destroyed or dismantled. See also "Battle of Rappahannock Station I".

The current Waterloo Bridge was constructed in 1878 for $7,050 by the Virginia Bridge and Iron Company. A one-lane, wrought iron bridge, it may be the oldest such bridge in Virginia. The counties of Fauquier, Culpeper, and Rappahannock all contributed to the funding, in order to enable local farmers and merchants to deliver goods to market. U.S. Route 211 was routed across the bridge from 1926 until about 1930.

Modern
Today, all that remains of the once busy nexus of commerce is a one-lane bridge, a home built around 1830 by John Spillman Armstrong, and the Waterloo Post Office (now a private residence) built on the Culpeper side in 1870 by Armstrong under contract to the U.S. Post Office. Local residents believe the post office was built by the U.S. government as a way of re-establishing its authority following the Civil War.

References

External links

Populated places in Fauquier County, Virginia